Carolyn Brandt is an American actress and dancer. She was the wife of cult film director Ray Dennis Steckler and starred in many of his films, including The Incredibly Strange Creatures Who Stopped Living and Became Mixed-Up Zombies!!?, The Thrill Killers (both 1964), Rat Pfink a Boo Boo (1966), and Blood Shack (1971).

Brandt was featured in the film It's a Bikini World as the dancer in "Liar, Liar" with The Castaways.

References

External links
 
 
 Review of 1994 film: Carolyn Brandt, Queen of Cult

American film actresses
Year of birth missing (living people)
Living people
21st-century American women